The Golem is a novel written in 1969 by Isaac Bashevis Singer that was first published in The Jewish Daily Forward.  It was rewritten and translated into English in 1981.

1969 American novels
Novels by Isaac Bashevis Singer
Novels first published in serial form
Works originally published in American newspapers
Yiddish-language literature
1969 children's books